Michael Paynter (born 29 January 1986), is an Australian singer-songwriter. Paynter has released five singles, "Closer", "A Victim Song", "Love the Fall", "How Sweet It Is" and "Weary Stars". Paynter competed in the second season of The Voice Australia after being dropped from his record label and successfully made the Top 16, but did not advance to the Top 12.

Early life
Paynter began playing instruments from a young age, playing the piano at the age of seven, and learning guitar and drums by the time he was 15. At the age of 16, he began playing in touring bands across Australia. Regarding music, Paynter says that it "was always something I was going to do, because it fires up my soul like nothing else". He studied law for a year, but returned to music. Although Paynter liked law school and intends to return, he says the choice was either "tour the country and play guitar or study books", and the decision "was a no-brainer". Paynter says that playing drums makes him a better guitarist, playing guitar makes him a better keyboardist, and playing all three makes him a better singer.

Career

2007–2012: Career launch

Critics have praised Michael Paynter's voice, often comparing him to John Farnham. Paynter says the title of his debut album, This Welcome Diversion, was inspired by an advertisement in an in-flight magazine; his music career is a diversion from his original path, law. Paynter wrote or co-wrote all of the tracks on This Welcome Diversion. To record the album, Paynter traveled to Los Angeles, where he worked with producer Matt Wallace and mixer Brian Paturalski. This Welcome Diversion features performances by Josh Freese, Dorian Crozer, David Ryan Harris and John Fields.

The first single, "Closer", was described as "a soaring, hook-filled track about striving for better". Paynter wrote "Closer" in collaboration with Gary Clark, and said that he fell in love with the song instantly. He said that "it works because the chords and rhythms are so simple. It's how people are, in their heads, never where they want to be whether it's a relationship or in a career. They're always wanting to be closer to the ideal." For the album, Paynter underwent a global four-month writing session, during which he also worked with Wally Gagel, Phil Buckle and Julian Hamilton of The Presets. The album's second single, "A Victim Song", was released on 15 November 2008 in Australia.

This Welcome Diversion was initially set to be released in 2008, but despite a set release date, was delayed until 2011. After the average performance of singles "Closer" and "A Victim Song", which Paynter felt "didn't have the support of radio or a strong online presence", he and label Sony agreed to delay the album's release. Paynter began touring, serving as a supporting act for Vanessa Amorosi, Newton Faulkner, Seal and The Veronicas on their Revenge Is Sweeter tour. In between tours, Sony (his label), had paid for songwriting trips to London and Los Angeles. This resulted in a free 10-track acoustic album titled Money on Your Tongue, containing three cover songs and a version of "Closer", which was initially released as individual tracks across 10 weeks from late October 2009.

In June 2010, Paynter released the single "Love the Fall", which became the most added song to Australian radio in the first week of July and his first top 20 single on the ARIA Singles Chart. The single features background vocals from The Veronicas, who also appear in the single's music video. The physical release of the single, is a five track EP, which includes the single "Are You Alive?", that was used to promote the final episode of Lost. In July, Paynter returned to Los Angeles to finish his album, with a tentative 2011 release date. Paynter said of his career, "It's been a really blessing for me. I don't think many artists get to make their debut record twice. I think if most artists got the chance to do it again, they'd take it." In October 2010 Paynter supported alternative rock band The Script for their two shows in Australia.

Michael also appeared on the Gypsy Heart Tour with Miley Cyrus as special guest in Australia. He debuted his new single called "How Sweet It Is" on the tour. 

In 2011, Michael joined the touring band of Icehouse.

2013–present: Weary Stars and The Voice Australia
In April 2013, Paynter auditioned for Season 2 of The Voice Australia and after successfully having all four judges turn their chairs, he chose Joel Madden as his coach. He successfully defeated Louise Roussety in the Battle Rounds with his rendition of "As Long as You Love Me" by Justin Bieber. He was saved by the public in part 2 of The Showdowns (for his performance of "The Horses" by Daryl Braithwaite), but failed to receive enough votes in the first Live Finals episode after performing "Locked Out of Heaven" by Bruno Mars, and was eliminated.

On 13 January 2014, Paynter released a new single, "Weary Stars". "Weary Stars" is the first single from Paynter's debut studio album of the same name. The album was released to iTunes on 31 January 2014.

In 2014–15 Paynter played keyboards and guitar on the Icehouse Australian tour. Besides backing vocals, he also sang "Man of Colours" at the live shows.
Michael spent most of 2015 touring supporting The Veronicas on their promotional tour and Delta Goodrem on her Wings promotion. He also contributed to Reece Mastin, on his album Change Colours, and especially on the single Even Angels Cry.

Paynter has joined Michael Delorenzis to create MSquared Productions, working as songwriters and producers.

Discography

Albums

Studio albums

Acoustic albums

Singles

As featured artist

Promotional singles

Other appearances

Notes

References

External links
 Official website
 Michael Paynter at Myspace
 Michael Paynter at Facebook
 Michael Paynter at Twitter

1986 births
Living people
21st-century Australian singers
Musicians from Melbourne
Icehouse (band) members
Australian Christians
Australian male singer-songwriters
Australian drummers
Australian keyboardists
Australian guitarists